Overland or Øverland or variants may refer to:

Places
 Overland, Missouri, a city in the United States
 Overland Park, Kansas, a city in the United States
 Overland Corner, South Australia, a settlement in Australia
 Overland Lake (Nevada), a glacial lake in the United States
 Øverland, Bærum, an area in Norway

People
 Øverland (surname), a Norwegian surname
 Amanda Overland, Canadian short track speed skater
 Kevin Overland, Canadian speedskater
 Simon Overland, Chief Commissioner of Victoria Police (Australia) since March 2009
 Steve Overland, British singer and musician
 Volkert Overlander, Dutch noble and merchant

Transport
Overland Trail, stagecoach line
Overland train, oversized off-road vehicle
Overland Track, Australian hiking trail

Companies
 Overland Automobile, the original name of the American company Willys-Overland
 Overland Custom Coach, Canadian custom vehicle manufacturer
 Overland Airways, Nigerian airline

Trains
 The Overland Limited, a named train that traversed the United States along the original route of the First transcontinental railroad.
 The Overland, the name used since 1926 for the inter-capital passenger train service that runs between Melbourne and Adelaide in Australia.
 The Overland Flyer, one of the named passenger trains of the Union Pacific Railroad

Events
Overland Campaign, U.S. Civil War campaign
Overland (Italian expedition), a series of expeditions and documentaries
Overland Relief Expedition, whaler rescue operation
 The Oxford and Cambridge Far Eastern Expedition, a 1955-6 journey undertaken in two Land Rovers from London to Singapore

Entertainment
 Land and Overland fictional universe
 Overland (magazine), an Australian literary and cultural magazine
 Overland Monthly, a defunct U.S. magazine
 Overland with Kit Carson, a Western film serial from the United States
 Overland (video game), a strategy video game

Other
 Overland Storage, a robotic tape library manufacturer, formerly known as Overland Data
 Overland Telegraph Company, U.S. telegraph company
 Overland High School in Aurora, Colorado

See also
Overland Expedition (disambiguation)
Overland Limited (disambiguation)
Overland Route (disambiguation)
Overlander (disambiguation)
Overlanding
Oberland (disambiguation)
Oberlander
Oorlams